Sanjay Verma (also known as V. Sanjay Verma) is an Indian film editor and sound designer.

Awards 

 IIFA Award for Best Editing in 2nd IIFA Awards for Kaho Naa... Pyaar Hai
 Screen Award for Best Editing for Kaho Naa... Pyaar Hai
 Filmfare Award for Best Editing in 34th Filmfare Awards for Khoon Bhari Maang
 Filmfare Award for Best Editing in 41st Filmfare Awards for Karan Arjun
 Filmfare Award for Best Editing in 46th Filmfare Awards for Kaho Naa... Pyaar Hai

References 

Living people
Filmfare Awards winners
Indian film editors
Sound designers
Year of birth missing (living people)